Kiff Slemmons (born 1944) is a contemporary American metalsmith. She received her B.A. in Art and French at the University of Iowa, but is primarily known for her career in jewelry and metals. Slemmons currently resides in Chicago, Illinois. Her work is collected by many notable museums and personalities, including the late Robin Williams.

Childhood and early life 
Kiff Slemmons was born in Maxton, North Carolina, but grew up in Iowa. The child of a pharmacist and newspaper publisher, Slemmons developed a love of the printed word and the Linotype early in life.

Education 
In 1962 Slemmons enrolled in Scripps College in Claremont, California for comparative literature, but left shortly for the Sorbonne in Paris, France in 1963. She completed her Bachelor of Arts degree in 1968 at the University of Iowa and later attended an eight-week metals program in Japan through Parsons The New School for Design in 1983.

Works 
Since 2000, Slemmons has been recognized for her work with Mexican artists making and designing paper jewelry, resulting in colorful and intricate pieces using traditional bead-making techniques and dyes from indigenous plants.

Her own work includes historical and literary references, incorporating selected found objects, generally non-precious materials, which she fabricates into detailed pieces with silver and other metals. Slemmons expresses that three threads run through her work, "scale, the language of material and the idea of more than one to make one.  She rejects the traditional valuation of jewelry based on the materials used, focusing instead on the ideas that go into each piece.

In her exhibition The Thought of Things, Slemmons made jewelry that used parts of aged photographs, rulers, typewriters, and other found objects in order to elicit a direct personal response. Another series of works that question worth and value was the much talked-about Re:Pair and Imperfection. In the process of preparing the series, she asked some of her peers to give her pieces that are unfinished because they are unwanted or somehow flawed. She used thirty donated objects of varying materials in the exhibition, which included wearables and sculptures with ornate details. Her intention was to make the viewer question the nature of imperfection and contemplate the new meaning of unconventional repair.

Although much of Slemmons' work references her early life and the time spent at her father's newspaper office, incorporating pencils and text, some of the artist's most recent work uses ancient artifacts and pays homage to ancient artisans and the persistence of the human spirit.

Selected collections 
The Victoria and Albert Museum
The Museum of Arts and Design
The Renwick Gallery
Mint Museum
The Museum of Fine Arts, Houston
The Museum of Fine Arts, Boston

Selected exhibitions 

 Huesos, Gallery Loupe, Montclair, NJ, 2012
 Ramona and Friends, Facèré Art Gallery, Seattle, WA, 2001
 The Thought of Things: Jewelry by Kiff Slemmons, Palo Alto Art Center, Palo Alto, CA, 2000
 Schmuchszene '95, Munich Germany, 1995
 Solo Exhibition, Mobilia Gallery, Cambridge, MA, 1994
 Solo Exhibition, Susan Cummins Gallery, Mill Valley, CA, 1993
 Documents Northwest: Six Jewelers, Seattle Art Museum, Seattle, WA, 1993

References

External links 
 Bear Claw Necklace
 Sconce Brooch
 Fish Slice, 2003
 Little Egypt, 1999 
 Feature in Craft in America, PBS
 Oral History Interview with Archives of American Art

1944 births
Living people
American blacksmiths
Women metalsmiths
20th-century American artists
20th-century American women artists
21st-century American artists
21st-century American women artists
University of Iowa alumni
Scripps College alumni
People from Maxton, North Carolina
Artists from Chicago
Artists from Iowa
Artists from North Carolina